Anjjan Bhattacharya is an Indian composer, film score composer and singer. Bhattacharya was part of Meet Bros but parted ways in 2017.

Bollywood discography

As Meet Bros Anjjan (2010-2015)

1 A different version of this song is included in the soundtrack.
2 One or more remixed version of this song is included in the soundtrack.

As Anjjan Bhattacharya (2016-present)

Awards and nominations

As Meet Bros Anjjan

References

External links 

Indian male composers
Indian male singers
Musicians from West Bengal